The 2022 LFA First Division (known as the Orange First Division for sponsorship reasons) was the 48th season of the Liberian First Division (formerly the Liberian Premier League), the top-tier football league in Liberia, since the league's establishment in 1956. The regular season began on November 3, 2021 and ended on April 17, 2022, with Watanga clinching their first ever league title.

Team changes

The following teams have changed division since the 2020–21 season.

To National Second Division
Relegated from 2020–21 Liberian First Division
 NPA Anchors
 Nimba
 Small Town

From National Second Division
Promoted to 2021–22 Liberian Second Division
 Heaven Eleven (promoted as champions)
 
 Sandi

Purchased statuses
 Invincible Eleven purchased their status from Barrack Young Controllers II.

Teams

Stadia and locations

Note: Table lists in alphabetical order.

Number of teams by county

Standings

Results

Relegation play-offs
The relegation play-offs took place between April 28 to May 8, 2022.

First round

|}
Invincible Eleven won 4–3 on aggregate, stay in First Division

Final round

MCBreweries is relegated to Second Division

Statistics

Top goalscorers

References

Football competitions in Liberia
2021–22 in African association football leagues
2021 in Liberian sport
2022 in Liberian sport